The Saint Lucia Workers' Union (SLWU) is a general trade union in Saint Lucia and the first union in the country.

Originally founded in 1939 as the Saint Lucia Workers' Co-operative Union, the union was renamed in 1956. Many of St Lucia's political parties have emerged from the union.

By the late 1960s, the SLWU claimed 2,500 members.

Trade unions in Saint Lucia
International Trade Union Confederation
Trade unions established in 1939
1939 establishments in Saint Lucia

References